The following outline is provided as an overview of and topical guide to North Macedonia:

North Macedonia is a landlocked sovereign country located on the Balkan Peninsula in Southern Europe. North Macedonia is bordered by Serbia and Kosovo to the north, Albania to the west, Greece to the south, and Bulgaria to the east.

North Macedonia forms approximately 35.8% of the land and 40.9% of the population of the wider geographical region of Macedonia, as it was defined in the late 19th century. The capital is Skopje, with 506,926 inhabitants according to a 2002 census, and there are a number of smaller cities, notably Bitola, Kumanovo, Prilep, Tetovo, Ohrid, Veles, Štip, Kočani, Gostivar and Strumica. It has more than 50 natural and artificial lakes and sixteen mountains higher than 2,000 meters (6,550 ft).

General reference 

 Pronunciation:
 Common English country name:  North Macedonia
 Official English country name:  The Republic of North Macedonia
 Common endonym(s): Severna Makedonija – Северна Македонија
 Official endonym(s): Republika Severna Makedonija  – Република Северна Македонија
 Adjectival(s): Macedonian
 Demonym(s):  Macedonian
 ISO country codes:  MK, MKD, 807
 ISO region codes:  See ISO 3166-2:MK
 Internet country code top-level domain:  .mk

Geography of North Macedonia 

 North Macedonia is: a country
 Location:
 Eastern Hemisphere
 Northern Hemisphere
 Eurasia
 Europe
 Southern Europe
 Balkans (also known as "Southeastern Europe")
 Time zone:  Central European Time (UTC+01), Central European Summer Time (UTC+02)
 Extreme points of North Macedonia
 High:  Mount Korab (Golem Korab) 
 Low:  Vardar 
 Land boundaries:  839 km 
 191 km
 159 km
 62 km
 165 km
 262 km
 Coastline:  none
 Population of North Macedonia: 
 Area of North Macedonia: 
 Atlas of North Macedonia

Environment of North Macedonia 

 Climate of North Macedonia
 Environmental issues in North Macedonia
 Renewable energy in North Macedonia
 Geology of North Macedonia
 Protected areas of North Macedonia
 Biosphere reserves in North Macedonia
 National parks of North Macedonia
 Wildlife of North Macedonia
 Flora of North Macedonia
 Fauna of North Macedonia
 Birds of North Macedonia
 Mammals of North Macedonia

Natural geographic features of North Macedonia 
 Mountains of North Macedonia
 List of World Heritage sites in North Macedonia

Regions of North Macedonia

Ecoregions of North Macedonia

Administrative divisions of North Macedonia 

 Municipalities of North Macedonia
 Statistical regions of North Macedonia

Municipalities of North Macedonia 

 Capital of North Macedonia: Skopje
 List of cities in North Macedonia

Statistical Regions of North Macedonia

Demography of North Macedonia

Government and politics of North Macedonia 

Politics of North Macedonia
 Form of government:
 Capital of North Macedonia: Skopje
 Elections in North Macedonia
 List of political parties in North Macedonia

Branches of the government of North Macedonia

Executive branch of the government of North Macedonia 
 Head of state: President of North Macedonia,
 Head of government: Prime Minister of North Macedonia,
 Cabinet of North Macedonia

Legislative branch of the government of North Macedonia 

 Parliament: Assembly of North Macedonia (unicameral)

Judicial branch of the government of North Macedonia 

 Supreme Court of North Macedonia

Foreign relations of North Macedonia 

 Diplomatic missions in North Macedonia
 Diplomatic missions of North Macedonia
 Greece–North Macedonia relations

International organization membership 
North Macedonia is a member of:

Bank for International Settlements (BIS)
Central European Initiative (CEI)
Council of Europe (CE)
Euro-Atlantic Partnership Council (EAPC)
European Bank for Reconstruction and Development (EBRD)
Food and Agriculture Organization (FAO)
International Atomic Energy Agency (IAEA)
International Bank for Reconstruction and Development (IBRD)
International Civil Aviation Organization (ICAO)
International Criminal Court (ICCt)
International Criminal Police Organization (Interpol)
International Development Association (IDA)
International Federation of Red Cross and Red Crescent Societies (IFRCS)
International Finance Corporation (IFC)
International Fund for Agricultural Development (IFAD)
International Labour Organization (ILO)
International Maritime Organization (IMO)
International Monetary Fund (IMF)
International Olympic Committee (IOC)
International Organization for Migration (IOM) (observer)
International Organization for Standardization (ISO)
International Red Cross and Red Crescent Movement (ICRM)
International Telecommunication Union (ITU)
International Trade Union Confederation (ITUC)

Inter-Parliamentary Union (IPU)
Multilateral Investment Guarantee Agency (MIGA)
North Atlantic Treaty Organization (NATO)
Organisation internationale de la Francophonie (OIF)
Organization for Security and Cooperation in Europe (OSCE)
Organisation for the Prohibition of Chemical Weapons (OPCW)
Partnership for Peace (PFP)
Permanent Court of Arbitration (PCA)
Southeast European Cooperative Initiative (SECI)
United Nations (UN)
United Nations Conference on Trade and Development (UNCTAD)
United Nations Educational, Scientific, and Cultural Organization (UNESCO)
United Nations High Commissioner for Refugees (UNHCR)
United Nations Industrial Development Organization (UNIDO)
United Nations Interim Force in Lebanon (UNIFIL)
Universal Postal Union (UPU)
World Confederation of Labour (WCL)
World Customs Organization (WCO)
World Federation of Trade Unions (WFTU)
World Health Organization (WHO)
World Intellectual Property Organization (WIPO)
World Meteorological Organization (WMO)
World Tourism Organization (UNWTO)
World Trade Organization (WTO)
World Veterans Federation

Law and order in North Macedonia 

 Constitution of North Macedonia
 Crime in North Macedonia
 Human rights in North Macedonia
 LGBT rights in North Macedonia
 Freedom of religion in North Macedonia
 Law enforcement in North Macedonia
 Nationality law of North Macedonia
 North Macedonian passport
 Identity card of North Macedonia

Military of North Macedonia 

 Command
 Commander-in-chief:
 Ministry of Defense of North Macedonia
 Minister of Defense (North Macedonia)
 Forces
 Army of North Macedonia
 Macedonian Lake Patrol Police
 North Macedonia Air Force
 Special forces of North Macedonia
 Military history of North Macedonia
 Military ranks of North Macedonia

Local government in North Macedonia

History of North Macedonia 

 Military history of North Macedonia

Culture of North Macedonia 

 Architecture of North Macedonia
 Cuisine of North Macedonia
 List of festivals in North Macedonia
 Languages of North Macedonia
 Media of North Macedonia
 National symbols of North Macedonia
 Coat of arms: National emblem of North Macedonia
 Flag of North Macedonia
 National anthem of North Macedonia: Denes nad Makedonija
 People of North Macedonia
 Public holidays in North Macedonia
 List of records of North Macedonia
 Religion in North Macedonia
 Christianity in North Macedonia
 Orthodoxy in North Macedonia
 Macedonian Orthodox Church
 Orthodox Ohrid Archbishopric
 Protestantism in North Macedonia
 Catholicism in North Macedonia
 Macedonian Greek Catholic Church
 Roman Catholic Diocese of Skopje
 Hinduism in North Macedonia
 Islam in North Macedonia
 Judaism in North Macedonia
 Sikhism in North Macedonia
 List of World Heritage sites in North Macedonia

Art in North Macedonia 
 Art in North Macedonia
 Cinema of North Macedonia
 Literature of North Macedonia
 Music of North Macedonia
 Television in North Macedonia
 Theatre in North Macedonia

Sports in North Macedonia 

 Football in North Macedonia
 North Macedonia at the Olympics

Economy and infrastructure of North Macedonia 

 Economic rank, by nominal GDP (2007): 124th (one hundred and twenty fourth)
 Agriculture in North Macedonia
 Banking in North Macedonia
 National Bank of North Macedonia
 Communications in North Macedonia
 Internet in North Macedonia
 List of companies of North Macedonia
 Currency of North Macedonia: Denar
 ISO 4217: MKD
 Energy in North Macedonia
 Energy policy of North Macedonia
 Oil industry in North Macedonia
 Health in North Macedonia
 Mining in North Macedonia
 Macedonia Stock Exchange
 Tourism in North Macedonia
 Transport in North Macedonia
 List of airports in North Macedonia
 Rail transport in North Macedonia
 Roads in North Macedonia

Education in North Macedonia

See also 

Index of North Macedonia-related articles
List of North Macedonia-related topics
List of international rankings
Member state of the United Nations
Outline of Europe
Outline of geography

References

External links 

 General

E-Government

 Travel
National Tourism Portal
Archaeological Sites

 Pictures
Panoramas of North Macedonia
Photo Gallery

North Macedonia
Outline